A motion to vacate is a formal proposal, either to 'vacate' (or reverse) the decision in a matter which had previously been formally ruled upon or decided, or to replace the holder of a presiding position.

Legal use

In the legal context, a motion to vacate is a formal request to overturn a court's earlier judgment, order, or sentence. This typically involves an attorney filing a written legal motion for consideration by a judge.

Parliamentary use

In a parliamentary context, as used in a legislative body, a motion to vacate is made by a member of the body to propose that the presiding officer (or 'chair') step down. That is commonly referred to as a "motion to vacate the chair".

In the U.S. House of Representatives

The use of a motion to vacate the chair has been very rare in the United States House of Representatives, despite the fact that under House rules it is considered a privileged motion, meaning any Member can offer such a motion at any time and is subject to an immediate vote. However, in the 116th and 117th Congress, under amendments made to the House rules, motions to vacate were not privileged "except if offered by direction of a party caucus or conference".

A motion to vacate the chair has been attempted twice in the House of Representatives: in March 1910 and in July 2015. The first attempt was to remove Speaker Joe Cannon, but the motion failed following a 192—155 vote.

The 2015 motion, filed by Mark Meadows to vacate the speakership of John Boehner, was non-privileged and was referred to the Rules Committee instead of triggering an immediate floor vote. The motion, however, contributed to the eventual resignation of Boehner in September 2015.

See also 
 Vacated judgment

References 

Common law legal terminology
American legal terminology
Legal motions